
In basketball, an assist is a pass to a teammate that directly leads to a score by field goal. The top 25 highest assists totals in National Collegiate Athletic Association (NCAA) Division I men's basketball history are listed below. The NCAA did not split into its current divisions format until August 1973. From 1906 to 1955, there were no classifications to the NCAA nor its predecessor, the Intercollegiate Athletic Association of the United States (IAAUS). Then, from 1956 to spring 1973, colleges were classified as either "NCAA University Division (Major College)" or "NCAA College Division (Small College)". Assists are a relatively new statistic in college basketball, having only become an official statistic beginning with the 1983–84 season. According to the 2009–10 NCAA Division I men's basketball media guide, however, there were two seasons in the early 1950s in which assists were recorded: 1950–51 and 1951–52.

The all-time leader in career assists is Bobby Hurley of Duke. He recorded 1,076 assists in 140 games (7.68 per game average) between 1989–90 and 1992–93. He also led the Blue Devils to consecutive national championships in 1991 and 1992. Second on the list is Chris Corchiani of NC State, another Atlantic Coast Conference school. In his four seasons, Corchiani compiled 1,038 assists. Only two other players besides Hurley and Corchiani have recorded 1,000 career assists at the Division I level: Ed Cota of North Carolina (1,030) and Jason Brickman (1,009) of LIU Brooklyn. Sherman Douglas of Syracuse is the only player on this list who also recorded 20 or more assists in a single game at both the Division I and National Basketball Association levels. For his college career, he played in 138 games while recording 960 assists.

Key

Top 25 career assists leaders

References
General

Specific

NCAA Division I men's basketball statistical leaders